T&N (previously Tooth and Nail) is an American hard rock band formed in 2011 by then-current and former members of Dokken.

History 
The band, originally named Tooth and Nail, was forced to change their name in March 2012 due to legal concerns, as the name was already trademarked.

The band announced on December 15, 2011, that they were in the process of recording an album consisting of both original material and Dokken covers, due to be released October 31, 2012.  In September 2012, the album's title was announced as Slave to the Empire, to be released on October 31 by Rat Pak Records.

In support of Slave to the Empire, T&N went on tour in late 2012, playing shows in the United States, eastern Asia and Europe between October and December.  According to Lynch, the band has recorded music for another album, though the release date is undetermined. In June 2019, Brown announced his retirement.

Members 
Jeff Pilson – lead and backing vocals, bass guitar, 8-string bass guitar, keyboards, acoustic guitar (2011–2012)
George Lynch – lead and rhythm guitar, acoustic guitar, backing vocals (2011–2012)
 Brian Tichy – drums (2011–2012)
Mick Brown – drums, percussion, backing vocals (2011–2012)

Discography 
2012: Slave to the Empire

References 

American heavy metal musical groups
Musical groups established in 2011
2011 establishments in the United States